is a single by Japanese boy band Kis-My-Ft2. It was released on November 13, 2013. It debuted in number one on the weekly Oricon Singles Chart and reached number one on the Billboard Japan Hot 100. It was the 20th best-selling single in Japan in 2013, with 306,433 copies.

References 

2013 singles
2013 songs
Japanese-language songs
Kis-My-Ft2 songs
Oricon Weekly number-one singles
Billboard Japan Hot 100 number-one singles
Japanese television drama theme songs